Goßdorf-Kohlmühle (known as Kohlmühle until 14 May 1936) is a railway station serving the villages of Goßdorf and Kohlmühle, Saxony, Germany. The station is served by one train service, operated by DB Regio in cooperation with České dráhy: the National Park Railway. This service connects Děčín and Rumburk via Bad Schandau and Sebnitz.

References

Deutsche Bahn website
Städtebahn Sachsen website

External links

Network map

Railway stations in Saxony
Hohnstein
Railway stations in Germany opened in 1877